Juba Oukaci (born July 8, 1996) is an Algerian footballer who plays as a Midfielder for JS Kabylie in the Algerian Ligue Professionnelle 1.

Career
After three years of being promoted on the first team he made his senior league debut for JS Kabylie on March 25 2017, coming on in the 90th-minute of the game as a substitute against MC Alger.

References

External links
 

1996 births
Algerian footballers
Algerian Ligue Professionnelle 1 players
JS Kabylie players
Kabyle people
Living people
People from Azazga
Association football midfielders
21st-century Algerian people